The Mad Dancer is a 1925 American silent drama film directed by Burton L. King and starring Ann Pennington, Johnnie Walker, and Coit Albertson.

Synopsis
Mimi, a dancer who lives in the Latin Quarter of Paris, poses nude for a sculpture. When her father commits suicide she moves to the United States but finds her relatives there disapprove of her. She becomes engaged to the son of an American senator, but her past threatens to catch up with her.

Cast

Production
The Mad Dancer was filmed at the Tec-Art Studio in New York City. Pennington, who had performed in the Ziegfeld Follies and George White's Scandals, appeared nude for the modeling scene for the sculpture. At the time, brief stationary nudity, similar to a tableau vivant, appeared in a few American films with scenes involving women posing for painters or sculptors. As an experiment, one scene involving Pennington and Vincent Lopez and his band was broadcast over the radio on Newark, New Jersey station WJZ (today WABC of New York City) while being filming.

Preservation
Prints of The Mad Dancer are held in the UCLA Film and Television Archive and George Eastman Museum Motion Picture Collection.

References

Bibliography
 Koszarski, Richard (2008). Hollywood on the Hudson: Film and Television in New York from Griffith to Sarnoff. Rutgers University Press. 
 Munden, Kenneth White (1997). The American Film Institute Catalog of Motion Pictures Produced in the United States, Part 1. University of California Press.

External links

Still on the cover of a French magazine
H.E.R. Studios, Inc. v. Jans Productions, Inc. (N.Y. Sup. 1925) (documents from appeal of court case on claim for costs of creating titles for The Mad Dancer)

1925 films
1925 drama films
1920s English-language films
American silent feature films
Silent American drama films
American black-and-white films
Films directed by Burton L. King
Films set in Paris
1920s American films
Films shot in New York City